The following is a summary of the Gemini Records albums. Gemini Records is a Norwegian record label.

References 

Discographies of Norwegian record labels